Ludington may refer to:

Places
United States
Ludington, Michigan, a city
Ludington Pumped Storage Power Plant
Ludington, Montana, an unincorporated community
Ludingtonville, New York, a hamlet
Ludington, Ohio, an unincorporated community
Ludington, Wisconsin, a town
Ludington (community), Wisconsin, an unincorporated community

People
Ludington (surname)
Ludington family, the American family whose members immigrated from the United Kingdom